Fontana is a lunar impact crater that is located in the southwestern part of the Moon's near side, to the south of the Oceanus Procellarum. It lies to the west-northwest of the flooded crater Zupus. Midway between Fontana and Zupus is a rille system designated Rimae Zupus.

This is a low-rimmed crater with an interior floor that is marked only by several small craterlets, and a few low ridges in the southwest. The rim is narrow and roughly circular, with an outward bulge at the northern end. There is a cleft in the northeastern part of the rim.

Satellite craters
By convention these features are identified on lunar maps by placing the letter on the side of the crater midpoint that is closest to Fontana.

References

 
 
 
 
 
 
 
 
 
 
 
 

Impact craters on the Moon